Alasha may refer to:
Alasha (tribe), a tribe of Kazakhs
Helan Mountains, a mountain range on the border between western Inner Mongolia and Ningxia, China
Alxa League, an administrative division in western Inner Mongolia, China
Alaşa, a village in Azerbaijan
Alasia, identified with Bronze Age Enkomi, Cyprus